The 1931 South American Championships in Athletics  were held in Buenos Aires, Argentina between 5 April and 5 May.

Medal summary

Men's events

Medal table

External links
 Men Results – GBR Athletics
 Women Results – GBR Athletics

S
South American Championships in Athletics
 Sports competitions in Buenos Aires
Athletics
Athletics
1931 in South American sport